Eudonia tibetalis is a moth in the family Crambidae. It was described by Aristide Caradja in 1937. It is found in the Chinese provinces of Qinghai, Sichuan and Yunnan.

References

Moths described in 1937
Eudonia